Lazar Radović (Cyrillic: Лазар Радовић; born 13 November 1937) is a Montenegrin retired footballer.

Club career
Radović played in Holland for Xerxes alongside Eddy Treijtel and Willem van Hanegem and was prepared to follow van Hanegem to Feyenoord in 1968, only to be persuaded by Kurt Linder to move to PSV where he was promised a job with Philips after his playing career. He would later work 27 years for the company in Belgrade.

International career
Radović made his debut for Yugoslavia in an October 1963 friendly match against Romania and has earned a total of 7 caps, scoring no goals. His final international was an October 1964 friendly against Israel.

References

External links

1937 births
Living people
Footballers from Podgorica
Association football defenders
Yugoslav footballers
Yugoslavia international footballers
Olympic footballers of Yugoslavia
Footballers at the 1964 Summer Olympics
FK Budućnost Podgorica players
FK Partizan players
Trikala F.C. players
XerxesDZB players
PSV Eindhoven players
Yugoslav First League players
Super League Greece players
Eredivisie players
Yugoslav expatriate footballers
Yugoslav expatriate sportspeople in Greece
Expatriate footballers in Greece
Yugoslav expatriate sportspeople in the Netherlands
Expatriate footballers in the Netherlands